Teotitlán de Flores Magón is a town and municipality in the Cañada region of Oaxaca in south-western Mexico.
It is part of the Teotitlán District in the north of the Cañada Region.

Municipality

The municipality covers an area of 95.69 km². 
As of 2005, the municipality had a total population of 8,675 of whom 1,610 speak an indigenous language.

History 
Jesús Flores Magón was born in Teotitlán in 1871 and Enrique Flores Magón in 1877, who together with their brother Ricardo Flores Magón- who was born in nearby San Antonio Eloxochitlán- stood out in the opposition to the government of Porfirio Díaz and are considered precursors of the Mexican Revolution. In their honor, in 1977 the Congress of Oaxaca officially changed the name of the town from Teotitlán del Camino to Teotitlán de Flores Magón.

References

Municipalities of Oaxaca